Mount Fraser can refer to:
 Mount Fraser (Australia)
 Mount Fraser (Canada)
 Mount Fraser (South Georgia)

See also
 Mount Frazier (Antarctica)
 Mount Frazier (Montana)